Punta Minuta is a  mountain in the department of Haute-Corse on the island of Corsica, France.
It is in the Monte Cinto massif.

Location

The peak is in the commune of Albertacce, just south of the communes of Asco to the northeast and Manso to the northwest.
The nearest road is the D147 to the north, which runs northwest from the village of Asco.

Physical

It is in the central chain of the Monte Cinto massif at a point where a ridge leads east to the  Monte Cinto.
It is in the Grande Barriere, the crestline that runs from Monte Cinto westward to Paglia Orba.
It is northeast of the  Paglia Orba.

Punta Minuta is drained to the west by tributaries of the Fango river, to the north by tributaries of the Asco river and to the south by tributaries of the Golo river.
The southern side of the mountain is free of snow from May/June until September.
The northern side retains snow and ice throughout the year.

Gallery

Notes

Sources

Mountains of Haute-Corse